Ivan Paskov (born 4 January 1973) is a former Bulgarian footballer who last played for Lokomotiv Sofia. In 2010, he retired from football and became a scout. His international career lasted a total of only a minute or so. He came on right at the end of Bulgaria's match with Croatia on 9 October 2004. His nickname is Прасковата ("The Peach").

Awards
 Champion of Bulgaria 1996 (with PFC Slavia Sofia)
 Champion of Bulgaria 2004 (with PFC Lokomotiv Plovdiv)

References

1973 births
Living people
Bulgarian footballers
Bulgaria international footballers
First Professional Football League (Bulgaria) players
Second Professional Football League (Bulgaria) players
PFC Slavia Sofia players
FC Dunav Ruse players
Akademik Sofia players
PFC CSKA Sofia players
PFC Spartak Varna players
PFC Velbazhd Kyustendil players
PFC Lokomotiv Plovdiv players
Kastoria F.C. players
FC Lokomotiv 1929 Sofia players
Bulgarian expatriate footballers
Expatriate footballers in Greece
Association football defenders